The 1900 Summer Olympics was the only Olympic Games to date to feature an equestrian high jump competition. Nineteen competitors entered the high jump competition (similar to the modern puissance), although not all details have been discovered.

Rain earlier on the day of the competition made the ground heavy and slippery, and the competition was close. Two competitors were awarded the joint gold medal when they both cleared .  Competitors were allowed to enter more than once: one of the joint gold medalists, Gian Giorgio Trissino, also came fourth on a different horse; he also won the silver medal in the Equestrian long jump competition. The bronze medalist, Georges Van Der Poele, also won the silver in the Equestrian jumping competition.

Background

No equestrian events were held at the first modern Olympics in 1896. Five events, including this one, were featured in 1900. Only the show jumping competition would ever be held again after that; this was the only appearance of the high jump.

Competition format

Much like the human high jump, competitors received three attempts at each successive height. The bar started at 1.20 metres and increased by 10 centimetres at a time initially, at some point changing to 5 centimetres. Riders could compete more than once on different horses.

Schedule

Results

Little is known of detailed results, though all of the competitors cleared 1.50 metres.

Notes

References

Sources
 International Olympic Committee medal winners database
 De Wael, Herman. Herman's Full Olympians: "Equestrian 1900". Accessed 29 July 2015.
 

Jumping